Anthony Lakes is a ski area in the northwest United States, located in eastern Oregon, near the cities of La Grande, and Baker City.

The resort also offers snowcat skiing on nearby peaks, and includes a boardercross course as well as a well maintained cross-country (Nordic) ski trails complete with its own Nordic center building.
Several backcountry skiing opportunities exist in the area. There are several areas in the nearby area, including Angell Basin, that offer backcountry skiing opportunities.

See also
 Anthony Lakes (Oregon)

References

Ski areas and resorts in Oregon
Tourist attractions in Baker County, Oregon
Tourist attractions in Union County, Oregon
Wallowa–Whitman National Forest
1967 establishments in Oregon